The men's 5000 metres event at the 1957 World University Games was held at the Stadium Charlety in Paris on 8 September 1957.

Results

References

Athletics at the 1957 World University Games
1957